Stony Creek Metropark is a Huron-Clinton Metropark located in southeast Michigan in the outskirts of metro Detroit. The park is predominantly in Washington Township and Oakland Township, with a small portion in Shelby Township.

Geography
Stony Creek Lake is a man-made lake built by damming Stony Creek, a tributary of the Clinton River.

Stony Creek Metropark is situated on a moraine which makes for varied landscape. The park has forests, hills, prairies, as well as swamps. The park is also relatively high above sea level, 875 feet (267 m) at the park office. Although a visitor can see downtown Detroit (26 miles away) from the park office, it is not the highest point in Macomb County, as many people believe.

Activities
Stony Creek has a vast amount of trails in four different locations around the park. There are 14 miles (22.5 km) of mountain biking/hiking trails located on the grounds of a former estate, of which the foundations are still visible. There are another 8.5 miles (13.7 km) of hiking trails near the nature center, and over 6 miles (10 km) of foot trails near Inwood lake. Additionally, there is a 6-mile (10 km) paved trail that circles Stony Creek lake which is popular with joggers, and inline-skaters.

Stony Creek Metropark also has:
 A , 18-hole golf course
 Snowboarding, sledding and tobogganing hills
 Two beaches on Stony Creek lake, Eastwood Beach and Baypoint Beach.
 Picnic areas with basketball courts, baseball fields, playgrounds, and beach volleyball courts
 Nature center
 Ice skating rink
 15 miles of trails open to mountain biking
 26-hole disc golf course
 Boat launch
 Rowboats, paddleboats, canoes, and kayaks available for rent
 Cross country skiing trails and ski rentals
 Trippo water slide

Wildlife
The park is reestablishing an osprey population in south-eastern Michigan. There are also wild turkey, deer, bald eagles, and other animals one can expect in south-east Michigan in the park. Birding is encouraged with the nature center maintaining a species list. There have been massasaugas, Michigan's only venomous snake, spotted during the spring and summer months.

References

External links
 Huron-Clinton Metroparks
 Clinton River Watershed Council
 Stony Creek Metropark Mountain Biking Trails at Clinton River Area Mountain Bike Association

Huron–Clinton Metroparks
Protected areas of Macomb County, Michigan
Nature centers in Michigan